Secrets of the Furious Five (also known as Kung Fu Panda: Secrets of the Furious Five) is a 2008 American animated short film produced by DreamWorks Animation, which serves as a semi-sequel/spin-off to the animated feature film Kung Fu Panda and appears on a companion disc of the original film's deluxe DVD release. It was later broadcast on NBC on February 26, 2009, and is now available as a separate DVD as of March 24, 2009.

The film has a framing story of Po the Dragon Warrior (in computer animation) telling the stories of his comrades in arms, the Furious Five, which are depicted in 2D cel animation, similar to the opening and end credits of the original film.

The only actors from the film to reprise their roles in this short were Jack Black as Po, Dustin Hoffman as Master Shifu, David Cross as Crane, and Randall Duk Kim as Master Oogway. Angelina Jolie, Lucy Liu, Jackie Chan and Seth Rogen do not reprise their roles mainly because their related characters are depicted as their younger selves.

In this short, Monkey is voiced by Jaycee Chan, son of Jackie Chan. Jaycee Chan also voiced Crane in the Cantonese version of the original film. Production of the film was outsourced to Reel FX Creative Studios, who worked on CG animation, and to Film Roman, who worked on traditionally animated sequences.

Plot

Introduction
Master Shifu instructs Po to teach an introductory Kung Fu lesson to a group of rambunctious bunny children. Po tries to teach the kids that combat is only part of what Kung Fu is about, as its true meaning is "excellence of self." To illustrate his point, he explains the Furious Five's individual backstories, and the basic philosophical concepts that enabled them to be great Kung Fu masters.

Mantis
Mantis, as a youth, was a petulantly impatient warrior, prone to jumping to conclusions and making impulsive decisions. Eventually, this habit got him captured by Crocodile bandits. The long wait Mantis was forced to endure in his prison taught him patience, and he was able to use this to play dead long enough to ambush his captors.

Viper
Viper, the daughter of Great Master Viper, was born without venomous fangs. Her father, who relied on his venomous bite to protect the village, believed she could never be a warrior like him, causing Viper to grow up shy and timid. One night during a festival, Great Master Viper encountered a gorilla bandit, and broke his fangs on the gorilla's special snake-proof armor. Seeing her father in peril, Viper found the courage to fight the bandit and defeat him with her ribbon dancing skills.

Crane
Crane was the self-deprecating janitor of a Kung Fu academy, until the star pupil Mei Ling encouraged him to seek enrollment. Crane's lifelong belief that he was too skinny to be an effective Kung Fu warrior caused him to lose his nerve at the tryouts; however, when he accidentally stumbled into the intense obstacle course to determine eligibility, he discovered the confidence to use his skinniness as an asset and pass the test.

Tigress
Tigress was an orphan, and unfairly isolated as a 'monster' because of her lack of control over her ferocity and strength. At the behest of the orphanage staff, Master Shifu arrived to teach her the discipline she desperately needed to control her movements. Eventually, the other children trusted and even befriended her. Despite this breakthrough, no adult would consent to adopt her, so Master Shifu took her in as his student and foster daughter.

MonkeyMonkey''' was humiliated in his youth, and grew up tormenting his village with pranks as revenge. Many challengers attempted to drive him away, but Monkey would always remove their pants to humiliate them. Master Oogway, who had a shell instead of pants, was able to subdue Monkey, and saved Monkey from being crushed by a column knocked loose in their brawl. Noticing Monkey's reaction to being cared about, Oogway told Monkey he could stay in the village as long as he would show others the compassion he so greatly desired himself.

Conclusion
Master Shifu returns, anticipating to find a lack of progress, and is surprised to see he has underestimated Po's talents yet again. When the Bunnies ask Po how his first day of Kung Fu was, Po has a flashback to all the unpleasant events of the first film. He then smiles and confidently assures them that "it was awesome!"

Voice cast
 Jack Black as Po
 Dustin Hoffman as Shifu
 David Cross as Crane
 Randall Duk Kim as Oogway
 Elizabeth Ann Bennett as Ant / Bunny
 Jaycee Chan as Young Monkey
 Jim Cummings as Instructor
 Jessica DiCicco as Young Viper
 John DiMaggio as Crocodile Bandit #1 / Gorilla Bandit
 Carol Kane as Sheep
 Stephanie Kearin as Crocodile Bandit #2
 Max Koch as Young Mantis
 Stephanie Lemelin as Mei Ling
 Meredith Scott Lynn as Master Viper's Mom
 Tom Owens as Ladybug
 Eamon Pirruccello as Impatient Bunny
 Grace Rolek as Shy Bunny
 Will Shadley as Nerdy Bunny
 James Sie as Great Master Viper
 Tara Strong as Young Tigress
Note: Mr Ping didn't appear in the short, only on the DVD cover of the film.

AwardsSecrets of the Furious Five'' has received eight nominations in the "Animated Television Production or Short Form" category at the 36th Annie Awards, of which it received four ("Character Animation," "Character Design," "Music," and "Production Design").

References

External links

 
 

Kung Fu Panda films
2008 films
2008 animated films
2000s American animated films
2000s animated short films
2008 action comedy films
American animated short films
American sequel films
Animated films about orphans
2008 computer-animated films
DreamWorks Animation animated short films
Films scored by Henry Jackman
Films scored by Hans Zimmer
Films scored by John Powell
Films directed by Raman Hui
Paramount Pictures animated films
Reel FX Creative Studios short films
Films with screenplays by Todd Berger
Wuxia films
Film Roman films
2000s English-language films